Mixtape Messiah 3 is a mixtape by southern rapper Chamillionaire. This is the third in the Mixtape Messiah It was released as a free download on Chamillionaire's website on July 18, 2007 at 11pm EDT to promote his album Ultimate Victory, then scheduled for release three months later. The free The Mixtape Messiah DVD, a compilation of interviews, show performances, backstage tour footage, and in-studio footage, was released at the same time.

Track listing

References 

 Kelefa Sanneh,  "Critics' Choice", New York Times, July 23, 2007.

External links 
 

Chamillitary Entertainment albums
Chamillionaire albums
2007 mixtape albums
Sequel albums